Ardalan (also Romanized as Ardalān) is a village in Ardalan Rural District, Mehraban District, Sarab County, East Azerbaijan Province, Iran. At the 2006 census, its population was 817, in 167 families.

References 

Populated places in Sarab County